Lisa Roy (born 16 January 1959) is a Canadian rower. She competed in the women's quadruple sculls event at the 1984 Summer Olympics.

References

External links
 

1959 births
Living people
Canadian female rowers
Olympic rowers of Canada
Rowers at the 1984 Summer Olympics
Rowers from Vancouver